Jedburgh in Roxburghshire was a royal burgh that returned one commissioner to the Parliament of Scotland and to the Convention of Estates.

After the Acts of Union 1707, Jedburgh, North Berwick, Dunbar, Haddington and Lauder formed the Haddington district of burghs, returning one member between them to the House of Commons of Great Britain.

List of burgh commissioners

 1661–63, 1665 convention, 1667 convention, 1669–74: John Rutherford, provost 
 1678 convention: James McCubie, provost 
 1681–82, 1685–86: Andro Ainslie, provost 
 1689 convention, 1689–1700: Adam Ainslie, baillie (died 1700)
 1700–02, 1702–07: Walter Scott, provost

See also
 List of constituencies in the Parliament of Scotland at the time of the Union

References

Constituencies of the Parliament of Scotland (to 1707)
Constituencies disestablished in 1707
1707 disestablishments in Scotland
History of the Scottish Borders
Politics of the Scottish Borders
Jedburgh